Christine Haidegger (27 February 1942 – 5 December 2021) was an Austrian poet and writer whose memoir Zum Fenster hinaus was translated into English as Mama Dear. She was influential in the Salzburg literary scene.

Biography
Haidegger was born to Austrian parents in Dortmund, Germany, and grew up in Upper Austria after World War II. She lived in Salzburg since the mid-1950s. After getting her Matura diploma, she spent considerable time in England, France, Italy, and the U.S. She worked as a freelance writer from 1964 onward. Her first novel Zum Fenster hinaus describes a post-war childhood in Austria. Haidegger published numerous novels, short stories, travelogues, plays and poems. In 1978, Haidegger took part in the Ingeborg Bachmann Prize in Klagenfurt. In 1991, she was writer-in-residence at Roanoke College in Virginia, US.

Personal life
Haidegger was married to Eberhard Haidegger. They had a daughter, Christina-Maria, who also became a writer and published under the pen name . After her daughter died in 1989, Haidegger managed the estate and initiated the Meta Merz Literature Prize.

Haidegger died on 5 December 2021, at the age of 79.

Works 
Haidegger published works of many genres, and edited works by her daughter Meta Merz. The jury of the Salzburg Poetry Award wrote in 2005 that her texts render convincingly both snapshots of seasons, nature and life, and existential experiences such as grief, loneliness, time and transience in an unpretentious language particularly distinguished by its apparent simplicity and careful imagery. ("")

As author 
Source: 

 Entzauberte Gesichte. Poetry. Darmstadt: Bläschke, 1976. 
 Zum Fenster hinaus. Eine Nachkriegskindheit. Novel. Reinbek: Rowohlt, 1979. 
 Adam / Adam. Novel. Vienna: Verlag der Österreichischen Staatsdruckerei, 1985. 
 Atem. Stille. Poetry. Baden: Grasl, 1993.	
 Schöne Landschaft. Collected prose. Salzburg: edition prolit, 1993. 
 Amerikanische Verwunderung. Skizzenbuch zu einem Aufenthalt. Short prose. Vienna: Wiener Frauenverlag, 1993. 
 Cajuns, Cola, Cadillac. American Sightseeing. Vienna: Milena, 1997. 
 Weiße Nächte. Poetry. Baden near Vienna: Grasl, 2002. 
 Mama Dear. English, translation of Zum Fenster hinaus. Riverside (CA), 2002. 
 
 Herz. Landschaft. Licht. Poetry. Salzburg: Otto Müller, 2009. 
 Translation into German of poetry "Riflessione" by Fabio Recchia, Levico (Italian), 2009.
 Texas Travels. Travel narratives. Vienna: Der Apfel, 2010. 
 Herzland. Poetry CD, 2013.
 Zum Fenster hinaus. Eine Nachkriegskindheit. Reissued. Salzburg, Vienna: Otto Müller Verlag, 2016. 
 Nach dem Fest. Stories. Salzburg, Vienna: Otto Müller Verlag, 2018. 
 Von der Zärtlichkeit der Wörter, poetry collection, 2020

As editor 
Source:

 Meta Merz: Erotik der Distanz. Vienna, 1990. .
 Meta Merz: Metaphysik der Begierde. Vienna, 1996. .

Awards
Source:

 1984 Culture Prize of the City of Salzburg
 1984 Georg Rendl Literature Prize
 1990 Salzburg State Culture Prize
 2002 Max von der Grün Prize
 2002 Gold medal of 
 2005 
 2012 City seal in silver of Salzburg

References

External links
 

1942 births
2021 deaths
20th-century Austrian women writers
Writers from Salzburg
Place of death missing
21st-century Austrian women writers
Austrian women poets
20th-century Austrian poets
21st-century Austrian poets